The N73 road is a national secondary road in Ireland. It is made up entirely of single carriageway with few overtaking opportunities and only a small amount of hard shoulder.

Route
It runs roughly east–west from its junction with the M8 motorway, bypassing Mitchelstown to the north via the Mitchelstown relief road, which opened in July 2006. The route then travels through Kildorrery, a small village and then on towards Mallow merging with the N72. There are no major improvements proposed for this route in the foreseeable future and only minor improvements have been made to date. The route is entirely in County Cork. The N73 is 32 km long. On 25 May 2009, a  Mitchelstown bypass (section of the single carriageway N8 road) was redesignated the N73 when the Mitchelstown-Fermoy section of the M8 motorway opened to traffic.

See also
Roads in Ireland 
Motorways in Ireland
National primary road
Regional road

References
Roads Act 1993 (Classification of National Roads) Order 2006 – Department of Transport

National secondary roads in the Republic of Ireland
Roads in County Cork